Protea nubigena, commonly known as cloud sugarbush, is a very rare species of a flowering shrub belonging to the Protea genus.

Description
It is a long-lived species, and survives fires by resprouting from underground boles or rootstocks. The plant is monoecious with both sexes in each flower; the wind-dispersed seeds are not stored on the plant and are released immediately after ripening. It is pollinated by birds.

Conservation
It is listed as 'critically endangered' on the SANBI red list, as the population of mature individual plants within the one known location are in decline, mostly due to poor fire management.

References

Sources 
 

nubigena
Flora of KwaZulu-Natal
Taxa named by John Patrick Rourke
Plants described in 1978